HSRA may refer to:

 High School for Recording Arts, a public charter high school in Saint Paul, Minnesota, United States
 Hindustan Socialist Republican Association, a defunct Indian revolutionary organisation that operated from 1924 to 1940
 HSRA, the Indian Railways station code for Hosur railway station, Tamil Nadu, India